Solanum burtonii is a species of plant in the family Solanaceae. It is endemic to Ecuador.

References

burtonii
Endemic flora of Ecuador
Data deficient plants
Taxonomy articles created by Polbot